Dranivia was an 18th-century Lauan chief and noble of the Vuanirewa dynasty. He was the third son of Uluilakeba I and last recorded member of the noble household, Naivi, to hold the title Roko Sau of the Lau Islands. He is referred to as an usurper and often oral history does not include hims as a Roko Sau. He is said to have snatched the chieftainship during the absence of his uncle Matawalu from Lakeba, and without the consent of the Vuanirewa. On hearing of his nephew's treachery, Matawalu returned from Bau and reasserted his authority, while Dranivia was touring the Southern Lau islands. Dranivia immediately returned to Lakeba which precipitated in kin slaying amongst the Vuanirewa. Dranivia was defeated and he fled with his supporters to Nayau and establishing the village of Liku.

It is recorded that Dranivia's aspiration for power does not end here. Matawalu himself was slain on Lakeba by his other nephew Malani, son of Rasolo. On hearing this Dranivia again raised an army and attempted to seize Lakeba again. His attempt was thwarted however as Malani's relative, a son of Delailoa residing on Nayau, warned him of Dranivia's impending plans. This information enabled Malani to crush Dranivia's forces and removed him from any further rebellions. It was due to the subduing of Dranivia, head the elder noble house of Naivi, by the younger noble households of Matailakeba (Malani) and Vatuwaqa (Taliai Tupou) that has completely eliminated any members of Naivi, the right to contest for the title of Tui Nayau to this day.

Fijian chiefs
People from Lakeba
Tui Nayau
Vuanirewa
Year of death missing
Year of birth missing